Donna Bullock is a Democratic member of the Pennsylvania House of Representatives representing the 195th House district in Philadelphia, Pennsylvania. Bullock is the chair of the Pennsylvania Legislative Black Caucus.

Formative years
Bullock graduated from New Brunswick High School in 1996, and earned her Bachelor of Science degree in Administration of Justice from Rutgers University in 2000. She then earned her Juris Doctor from the Beasley School of Law at Temple University in 2003.

She married Otis L. Bullock, Jr.

Political career
A Democrat, Bullock was elected to the Pennsylvania House of Representatives in 2015, representing District 195 which covers part of Philadelphia County. In 2019, she was the Democratic Chair of the House Appropriations Subcommittee, on Criminal Justice; the Democratic Secretary of the House's Committee on Urban Affairs, and a member of the House committees on Consumer Affairs and Professional Licensure.

References

External links
PA House profile
Official Party website

Living people
Democratic Party members of the Pennsylvania House of Representatives
African-American state legislators in Pennsylvania
21st-century American politicians
Year of birth missing (living people)
21st-century African-American politicians
Place of birth missing (living people)